Anna Ivanovna Glushenkova (1 August 1926, Matyshevo, Volgograd Region of the RSFSR – 18 April 2017, Tashkent) was a Russian–born Uzbekistani chemist, a prominent scientist in the field of chemistry and technology of natural compounds, Honored Scientist of the Republic of Uzbekistan, Academician of the Academy of Sciences of the Republic of Uzbekistan.

Life 
Anna Glushenkova was born on 1 August 1926 in the Rudninsky district of the Volgograd region of the Russian Federation. In 1948 she graduated from the Central Asian Industrial Institute (now Tashkent State Technical University), then defended her PhD and doctoral dissertation.

Career 
In 2000, Glushenkova was elected a full member of the Academy of Sciences of the Republic of Uzbekistan. During almost 70 years of her scientific and pedagogical career Glushenkova worked as a head of the department of the Tashkent Polytechnic Institute (now Tashkent State Technical University), senior researcher, head of laboratory, director of the Institute of Chemistry of Plant Substances Academy of Sciences, a member of the Presidium of the Academy of Sciences.

She was a deputy editor-in-chief of the magazine “Chemistry of Natural Compounds” (rus.“Химия природных соединений”). 

Glushenkova is the author of over 400 scientific articles, books and monographs on theoretical and practical issues of chemistry and technology of natural compounds.

Under her supervision dozens of candidates and doctors of sciences were trained.

Glushenkova was awarded the honorary title “Honored Scientist of the Republic of Uzbekistan” and the order “Mekhnat Shukhrati”.

Anna Glushenkova died on 18 April 2017 in Tashkent at the age of 91.

Awards and honors 

 Honored Scientist of the Republic of Uzbekistan
 Mekhnat Shukhrati Order

Works 

 Lipids, Lipophilic Components and Essential Oils from Plant Sources, .

References 

1926 births
2017 deaths
People from Volgograd Oblast
Scientists from Tashkent
Uzbekistani people of Russian descent
Women chemists
Russian women scientists
Uzbekistani women scientists
Soviet women chemists
Academic staff of Tashkent State Technical University